Maximiliano "Maxi" Viera Dutra (born 24 October 1968) is a Uruguayan football manager and former player who played as a midfielder.

Playing career
Viera, son of Uruguayan international Milton Viera, graduated from Italian High School in Montevideo, Uruguay. In 1983, he began his professional career with C.A. Peñarol before moving to Rampla Juniors in 1989. In 1992, Viera moved to Ecuador to play for Macará Ambato for one season before returning to Uruguay to join Huracán Buceo and Sud América in 1994. In 1995, Viera moved to Chile to play for Regional Atacama before moving to the United States.

On February 7, 1999, the San Jose Clash selected Viera in the first round (11th overall) of the 1999 MLS Supplemental Draft. Viera spent most of his time with the Clash on injured reserves with a broken right clavicle. Viera was up for selection off the bench June 3, 1999 vs Colorado Rapids. On June 30, 1999, the Clash waived Viera. He played one game for the San Francisco Bay Seals in 1999. He signed with the Colorado Rapids for the remainder of the 1999 season, made no appearances.  In February 2000, he signed with the St. Louis Ambush of the National Professional Soccer League.  The Ambush folded at the end of the season.  In 2001, Viera played for the Tucson Fireballs.

Coaching career
Coach Viera has achieved great success in Arizona after retiring from professional Football, has won many State Championship in Arizona and over 20 Tournaments in the US with different age groups of Boys and Men and Girls and Women from 2002 until 2014. Coach Viera received the award of VYSL "Coach of the year 2006 and 2007. In 2009 he received his Diploma for his National USSF B License Concacaf and decided to work back at the Elite levels of soccer.

Viera was the Technical Director of the Ahwatukee Foothills Soccer Club in Phoenix Arizona from 2011 to 2015, before he signed with the Qatar national football team as the assistant coach of compatriots José Daniel Carreño and Jorge Fossati. In 2017 Legacy Arizona asked Coach Viera to work in the Club and to mentor younger coaches as Assistant Director in the club until 2018.

In 2018, Viera was hired by FC Arizona (NPSL) as the Head Coach. After making the play-offs, he decided to take the job in South America and in July of the same year decided to move to Uruguay and coached Miramar Misiones, a Uruguayan Professional Second Division Team for the Torneo Clausura.

In 2019 Montevideo Wanderers FC announced on their media account that coach Viera signed for the season 2019–20 with the club. In 2020, he joined Deportivo Cali's staff before being appointed manager of Sud América.

In 2021, Viera became the new coach of Club Atlético Progreso.

In 2022 Central Español Football Club  a former uruguayan Champion (1984)  announced in their website  Coach Viera as the new Head Coach.

References

External links
 
 

1968 births
Association football midfielders
Bay Area Seals players
C.S.D. Macará footballers
Expatriate footballers in Chile
Expatriate footballers in Ecuador
Expatriate soccer players in the United States
Huracán Buceo players
Living people
National Professional Soccer League (1984–2001) players
Peñarol players
Rampla Juniors players
Regional Atacama footballers
San Jose Earthquakes draft picks
San Jose Earthquakes players
St. Louis Ambush (1992–2000) players
Sud América players
Tucson Fireballs players
Uruguayan expatriate footballers
Uruguayan footballers
A-League (1995–2004) players
USL Second Division players
Uruguayan football managers
Uruguayan Primera División managers
Uruguayan Segunda División managers
C.A. Progreso managers